Record of the Year may refer to:
Grammy Award for Record of the Year
Latin Grammy Award for Record of the Year
The Record of the Year, a British award based on public polling
Aotearoa Music Award for Radio Airplay Record of the Year
Libera Award for Record of the Year

See also

Album of the Year (disambiguation)